Woolwich West by-election may refer to one of two by-elections held for the British House of Commons constituency of Woolwich West:

1943 Woolwich West by-election
1975 Woolwich West by-election

See also
Woolwich East by-election (disambiguation)
Woolwich West (UK Parliament constituency)